Mr. Beller's Neighborhood is a literary website focused on true stories set in New York City that was founded in 2000 by author Thomas Beller.  It publishes original, previously unpublished non-fiction essays and vignettes.

History 
It was one of the first websites to use a map as a way of organizing stories, initially using a satellite photo. In 2005 it switched to Google Maps.

After the 9/11 attacks the site became "the locus for a growing collaborative history," and in 2002 it was nominated for a Webby Award in the Print and Zine category.

It has publishered over a thousand original pieces of writing including work by authors: Michael Cunningham, Nick Tosches, Jonathan Ames, Sam Lipsyte, Rachel Sherman,  Alexander Chancellor, Bryan Charles,  Thomas Beller, Meghan Daum, Lucy Sante, Alicia Erian, Rachel Cline, Vince Passaro, Jeanette Winterson, Peter Nolan Smith, Debbie Nathan, Anne Meara, and Madison Smartt Bell.

It has published two anthologies of original work first published on the site: "Before and After: Stories From New York", and "Lost and Found: Stories From New York".

References

American literature websites